Roller Skater is a steel roller coaster at Kentucky Kingdom in Louisville, Kentucky. The ride opened on April 15, 1994, as part of a $5 million expansion that included three other rides, including Mile High Falls, International Carousel (now known as Bella Musica), and Sky Rider. It is a junior coaster that uses roller skate shaped cars. Like many of its clones, it is a Vekoma Roller Skater type of coaster. These kinds of coasters can be found at Six Flags parks and other parks as well.

The ride was constructed by Martin & Vleminckx.

The ride was repainted in August 2013 and it reopened on May 24, 2014, after remaining closed since 2009.

References 

Kentucky Kingdom
Roller coasters in Kentucky
1994 establishments in Kentucky